"I've Got a Tiger By the Tail" is a song made famous by country music band Buck Owens and the Buckaroos. Released in December 1964, the song was one of Owens' signature songs and showcases of the Bakersfield sound in the genre.

In 1965, Dave Berry used "I've Got a Tiger By the Tail" as the B-side of his single "Little Things" and the single reached number 5 in the UK Singles Chart.

About the song
Owens — in the liner notes to The Buck Owens Collection: 1959-1990 — recalled that he and songwriter Harlan Howard had gotten together to write songs, but things were going slowly. Then, Owens saw an Esso gas station sign with the company's slogan at the time, "Put a tiger in your tank" ... and got an idea.

Released in December 1964 (just weeks after he had recorded it), "I've Got a Tiger By the Tail" was Owens' and the Buckaroos sixth No. 1 hit on the Billboard magazine Hot Country Singles chart in February 1965. The song is Owens' and the Buckaroos biggest hit (and only top-40 hit) on the Billboard Hot 100, where it peaked at No. 25, although its five weeks atop the chart made it far from Owens' biggest hit on the country charts — several of his other No. 1 songs spent anywhere from six to 16 weeks at No. 1.

Chart performance

References

Songs about mammals
1965 singles
Buck Owens songs
Songs written by Harlan Howard
Grammy Hall of Fame Award recipients
Songs written by Buck Owens
Song recordings produced by Ken Nelson (American record producer)
Capitol Records singles
1964 songs